Danderyds sjukhus is a metro station in suburban Danderyd Municipality, north of Stockholm, Sweden.

The station was opened on 29 January 1978 as part of the extension from Universitetet to Mörby centrum and serves the nearby Danderyds sjukhus hospital. The Mörby railway station on the Roslagsbanan is situated a few hundred metres from this station.

References

Red line (Stockholm metro) stations
Railway stations opened in 1978
1978 establishments in Sweden